Darrah (formerly Snow Creek and Darrah's) is an unincorporated community in Mariposa County, California.

The Darrah post office operated from 1880 to 1907, with a closure from 1889 to 1890. The name honors Richard Darrah, its first postmaster.

References

Unincorporated communities in California
Unincorporated communities in Mariposa County, California